Filip Roos (born 5 January 1999) is a Swedish professional ice hockey defenseman currently playing for the  Chicago Blackhawks of the National Hockey League (NHL).

Playing career
Roos as a youth originally played with Hanhals IF and IF Troja-Ljungby before making his Swedish Hockey League debut in the 2018–19 season with Frölunda HC.

After two seasons in the HockeyAllsvenskan with BIK Karlskoga, leading the blueline in scoring with 28 points in 2020–21, Roos was signed to a two-year contract in returning to the SHL with Skellefteå AIK on 4 May 2021.

In his first full season in the SHL in 2021–22, Roos registered 6 points through 50 games with Skellefteå. He also added an assist in six postseason games with the club.

Showing strong skating abilities for his size, Roos used an NHL out-clause in his contract in leaving the SHL and signing as an undrafted free agent to a two-year, entry-level contract with the Chicago Blackhawks on 23 May 2022. 

After attending his first training camp and pre-season with the Blackhawks, Roos remained on the  season opening roster. He made his NHL debut on an opening night defeat to the Colorado Avalanche on 13 October 2022.

On 12 November 2022 Roos scored his first NHL goal with the Chicago Blackhawks 4:04 in the second period against the Anaheim Ducks.

Career statistics

References

External links

1999 births
Living people
BIK Karlskoga players
Chicago Blackhawks players
Frölunda HC players
Ice hockey people from Gothenburg
Rockford IceHogs (AHL) players
Skellefteå AIK players
IF Troja/Ljungby players
Undrafted National Hockey League players